Sam Kendal may refer to:

Sam Kendal, drummer on Left for Dead (EP)
Sam Kendal, character in Last Resort (U.S. TV series)

See also
Samuel Kendall, Republican politician